Gunwanti is an Indian village located in Raniganj Block of Araria District, Bihar.

References

India
Geography of Bihar